Barry McKinlay (born August 8, 1967) is a Canadian retired professional ice hockey defenceman.

Early life and education 
McKinlay in 1967 in Edmonton, Alberta. He McKinley attended the University of Illinois at Chicago, where he played NCAA college hockey with the UIC Flames men's ice hockey team, earning him a Second Team All-CCHA spot.

Career 
McKinlay was selected by the Montreal Canadiens in the 10th round (206th overall) of the 1987 NHL Entry Draft.

McKinlay did not play any regular season NHL games National Hockey League, but went on to play 13 seasons of professional hockey, mostly in the Colonial Hockey League/United Hockey League, where he played 640 regular season and playoff games. McKinlay is one of seven defencemen in history to score 100 points in a professional hockey season (126) in 1997–98. He was a three-time UHL Defenceman of the year, and a four-time 1st Team All-Star.

McKinlay played the 2000–01 season with the Tupelo T-Rex of the Western Professional Hockey League (WPHL) where he was recognized by his peers as having the hardest shot in the WPHL, and was selected as the league's second best offensive defenceman (behind Mark DeSantis). Won the Hardest shot competition at the WPHL All-Star game (103.9 mph).

Awards and honours

References

External links

Living people
1967 births
Bracknell Bees players
Canadian ice hockey defencemen
Lubbock Cotton Kings players
Montreal Canadiens draft picks
Motor City Mustangs players
Port Huron Beacons players
Prince Edward Island Senators players
Rockford IceHogs (UHL) players
Ice hockey people from Edmonton
Thunder Bay Senators players
Thunder Bay Thunder Cats (CoHL) players
Thunder Bay Thunder Cats (UHL) players
Thunder Bay Thunder Hawks players
UIC Flames men's ice hockey players
Canadian expatriate ice hockey players in England